Michael Alexander Cloud (born July 1, 1975) is a former American college and professional football player who was a running back in the National Football League (NFL) for seven seasons.  He played college football for Boston College, and was recognized as an All-American.  A second-round pick in the 1999 NFL Draft, he has played professionally for the Kansas City Chiefs, New England Patriots, and New York Giants of the NFL.

Early years
Cloud was born in Charleston, South Carolina, and moved to Rhode Island at age five.  He attended Portsmouth High School in Portsmouth, Rhode Island, and played both offense (running back) and defense (linebacker and cornerback) in high school football.

College career
Cloud attended Boston College, where he played for the Boston College Eagles football team from 1995 to 1998.  During his four years as an Eagle, he rushed for a team career record of 3,597 yards in 45 games.  He rushed for 886 yards on 137 carries and eight touchdowns in 1997.  As a senior in 1998, he ran for 1,726 yards on 308 carries, scored 14 touchdowns, and was recognized a consensus first-team All-American.

Professional career
Cloud was selected by the Kansas City Chiefs in the second round of the 1999 NFL Draft, and was the 54th overall choice. He played four seasons with the Chiefs, appearing in 56 of their 64 games but only starting six. He gained 128 yards in the 1999 season, his career high. Late in the 2002 season, Cloud tested positive for nandrolone use and was suspended for the first four games of the 2003 season. He later sued MuscleTech after claiming that one of their over-the-counter supplements, Nitro-Tech, caused the positive test. Cloud spent 2003 with the Patriots in a reserve role.  He scored five rushing TDs in the 2003 season, two apiece against the Tennessee Titans and Indianapolis Colts and one against the New York Giants. He was on the roster for the postseason including the Super Bowl XXXVIII win, but was inactive.  He went to the Giants for the 2004 season, but was released before the 2005 season began, and signed with New England as a free agent on November 5 due to the injuries to Corey Dillon and Kevin Faulk.

References

1975 births
Living people
All-American college football players
American football running backs
American sportspeople in doping cases
Boston College Eagles football players
Doping cases in American football
Kansas City Chiefs players
New England Patriots players
New York Giants players
Sportspeople from Charleston, South Carolina
People from Portsmouth, Rhode Island